Joseph Huber (24 September 1893 in Dornach – 18 January 1976 in Pfastatt) was a French gymnast who competed in the 1924 Summer Olympics.

References

1893 births
1976 deaths
French male artistic gymnasts
Olympic gymnasts of France
Gymnasts at the 1924 Summer Olympics
Olympic silver medalists for France
Olympic medalists in gymnastics
Medalists at the 1924 Summer Olympics
20th-century French people